Khadamabad may refer to:
 Khadamabad, Iran
 Khadamabad, Kohgiluyeh and Boyer-Ahmad, Iran
 Khadamabad, Pakistan